Jules Marouzeau (20 March 1878 – 27 September 1964) was a French philologist.

1878 births
1964 deaths
French philologists
French Latinists
Lycée Voltaire (Paris) teachers